Eva Krapl (January 16, 1966) is a former professional tennis player from Switzerland, active from 1987 to 1990.

Krapl currently works as a coach in the TIF Academy in Switzerland.

ITF Circuit finals

Singles finals: 1 (0–1)

Doubles: 2 (0–2)

References

Swiss female tennis players
Living people
1966 births